Izadkhvast District is a district (bakhsh) in Zarrin Dasht County, Fars Province, Iran. In the 2006 census, its population was 13,121, in 2,895 families.  The District has one city: Shahr-e Pir. The District has two rural districts (dehestan): Izadkhvast-e Gharbi Rural District and Izadkhvast-e Sharqi Rural District.

References 

Zarrin Dasht County
Districts of Fars Province